Bicycle Hora is a 1968 Sri Lankan Black and white thriller film directed by K.A.W. Perera and produced by E. A. P. Edirisinghe for EAP Films. The film stars Oswald Jayasinghe and Sandhya Kumari in lead roles whereas Jeevarani Kurukulasuriya, D. R. Nanayakkara and Wally Nanayakkara made supportive roles. Film music score done by Premasiri Khemadasa.

The film received critics acclaim and later won many awards at third Sarasaviya Awards Ceremony.

Cast
 Sandhya Kumari
 Oswald Jayasinghe
 D. R. Nanayakkara
 Jeevarani Kurukulasuriya
 Wally Nanayakkara
 Gemunu Wijesuriya
 Ruby de Mel
 B. S. Perera
 Leticia Peiris
 David Dharmakeerthi
 Lilian Edirisinghe
 Sonia Disa
 Pearl Vasudevi
 Richard Albert
 Joseph Seneviratne
 Robin Fernando
 Don Sirisena
 Jessica Wickramasinghe
 Herbert Amarawickrama
 Thalatha Gunasekara

Awards
 Best Film – 3rd place at 6th Sarasaviya Awards - 1969	
 Best Actor – D.R. Nanayakkara at 6th Sarasaviya Awards - 1969	
 Best Supporting Actress – Jessica Wickramasinghe at 6th Sarasaviya Awards - 1969	
 Best Director – K.A.W. Perera at 1st place at Gunwan Viduli Sammana Ulela 1970	 
 Best Script Writer – K.A.W. Perera at 1st place at Gunwan Viduli Sammana Ulela 1970

References

External links
 

1968 films
1960s Sinhala-language films